Thakur College of Science and Commerce is a college located in Kandivali, Mumbai in the state of Maharashtra, India which was established by Thakur Educational Trust in 1992.

References

Alumis

Anushka Sen

Siddharth Nigam

Mahima Makwana

Kavya Thapar

Sheena Bajaj

Girija Oak

External links
Official website

Universities and colleges in Mumbai
Affiliates of the University of Mumbai
Educational institutions established in 1992
Colleges in India
1992 establishments in Maharashtra